The Christchurch City Shiners were a New Zealand rugby league club that represented Christchurch in the Lion Red Cup from 1994 to 1996. They were administered by the Canterbury Rugby League.

Feeder clubs included Addington, Sydenham and Linwood.

Players
Notable players included Simon Angell, Blair Harding, Richard Morris, Brett Roger, Andrew Koro Vincent, Shane Endacott, Phil Bergman, Vii Mulipola, and Marty Crequer.

Coaches
The Shiners had four different coaches over the three years of the competition: Wayne Wallace, Mark Vincent, Lex Clark and Jeff Carr.  Kiwis coach Frank Endacott assisted Wallace in the first year of the competition.

Season Results

References

Defunct rugby league teams in New Zealand
Rugby league in Canterbury, New Zealand
Rugby clubs established in 1994
1994 establishments in New Zealand
1996 disestablishments in New Zealand